Wieniec may refer to:

Wieniec, Lesser Poland Voivodeship (south Poland)
Wieniec, Mogilno County in Kuyavian-Pomeranian Voivodeship (north-central Poland)
Wieniec, Włocławek County in Kuyavian-Pomeranian Voivodeship (north-central Poland)
Wieniec, Masovian Voivodeship (east-central Poland)